The 2009 Boko Haram uprising was a conflict between Boko Haram, a militant Islamist group, and Nigerian security forces.

History
Violence across several states in northeastern Nigeria resulted in more than 1,000 dead, with around 700 killed in the city of Maiduguri alone, according to one military official.

A government inquiry later found that, while long-standing tensions existed between Boko Haram and the Nigerian Security forces, the immediate cause of the violence stemmed from a confrontation between a group of sect members and joint tax forces located at custom bridge Gamboru ward in the city of Maiduguri. The Boko Haram members were en route to bury one of their members at the Gwange cemetery. The officers, part of a special operation to suppress violence and rampant crime in Borno State, demanded that the young men comply with a law requiring motorcycle passengers to wear helmets. They refused and, in the confrontation that followed, police shot and wounded several of the men.

According to initial media reports, the violence began on 26 July when Boko Haram launched an attack on a police station in Bauchi State. Clashes between militants and the Nigeria Police Force erupted in Kano, Yobe and Borno soon after. But President Umaru Yar’Adua disputed this version of events, claiming that government security forces had struck first.

“I want to emphasize that this is not an inter-religious crisis and it is not the Taliban group that attacked the security agents first, no. It was as a result of a security information gathered on their intention ... to launch a major attack," he said.

Nigerian troops surrounded the home of Ustaz Mohammed Yusuf, the founder and spiritual leader of Boko Haram since 2002, in Maiduguri on 28 July after his followers had barricaded themselves inside. On July 30, the military captured Yusuf and transferred him to the custody of the police. They summarily executed him in public outside police headquarters.

Islam Online suggests that politics, not religion, was the cause of the violence. People such as Christian pastor George Orjih were murdered specifically because they refused to convert to Islam.

Prior to the clashes, many local Muslim leaders and at least one military official had warned the Nigerian authorities about the Boko Haram sect. Those warnings were reportedly ignored.

Bauchi, Bauchi State
On 26 July, more than 50 people were killed and several dozen were injured in Bauchi when a firefight erupted as a police station was attacked by 70 Nigerian Boko Haram sect members, who were armed with grenades and small arms. One government soldier and 32 Boko Haram militants were killed in the aftermath of the initial attack. The government claimed that 39 militants had been killed, and confirmed the death of a soldier. The attack was initiated by Boko Haram after their leaders were detained by the police. Security forces retaliated by raiding the neighbourhoods where the group was entrenched.

Isa Yuguda, State Governor of Bauchi, commented: "We have pre-empted the militants. Otherwise the situation would have been bad. I'm calling on all the people of Bauchi to be calm and be rest assured the situation has been brought under control."

Yuguda declared a night-time curfew, and the police maintained a visible profile. Businesses remained open in the area.

Maiduguri, Borno State
In July 2009, media reported that 100 bodies were found beside police headquarters in Maiduguri. Hundreds of people were leaving their homes to escape the violence. A jailbreak was reported but was not immediately confirmed. Several civilian corpses lay in the city's streets; witnesses said they had been shot after being pulled from their cars. The country's army and police were both on patrol and firing at suspects.

On 28 July, Army soldiers reportedly launched an offensive on the compound of sect leader Mohammed Yusuf and a nearby mosque used by his followers in the Borno state capital of Maiduguri. Troops shelled Mohammed Yusuf's home in the city after Yusuf's followers barricaded themselves inside. Shots rained across the city.

On 30 July, Nigerian security forces killed 100 Boko Haram militants in fighting in Maiduguri. Security forces fought their way into a mosque occupied by militants, raking the interior with machine gun fire. Elsewhere, Military and Police forces engaged militants in house-to-house fighting. It was initially reported that Boko Haram vice-chairman Abubakar Shekau had been killed, but he was later reported alive. Nigerian policemen were also killed. After the government declared Maidguri to be secured, Nigerian forces began setting up mortar positions to shell the remaining enemy compound.

On 30 July, Yusuf was captured by the military and handed over to the police at the police headquarters in Maiduguri. Police officers summarily executed Yusuf inside the compound in full view of public onlookers. Police officials initially claimed that either Yusuf was shot while trying to escape or died of wounds sustained during a gun battle with the military. The police also executed other Boko Haram suspects, including Yusuf's father-in-law, outside the police headquarters.

On 2 August, a group of women and children abducted by Boko Haram were found locked in a house in Maiduguri. The military said a total of 700 people were killed in Maiduguri during the clashes. The Red Cross later said that it had taken 780 bodies from the streets of the city to be buried in mass graves.

Potiskum, Yobe State
A gun battle lasting several hours took place in Potiskum. Boko Haram militants set a police station on fire using fuel-laden motorcycles. The police station burned to the ground, and as a result, a police officer and a fire safety officer were both killed. Police engaged the fighters and wounded several. Police arrested 23 fighters after the battle. According to Nigerian sources, 43 Boko Haram fighters were killed in a shootout near the city on 30 July.

Wudil, Kano State
Three people were killed in an attack in Wudil, and police forces made more than 33 arrests. Wudil's senior police officer was injured.

See also

Bauchi prison break

References

External links
 Al Jazeera (9 February 2010), Video shows Nigeria 'executions'
 Baldauf, Scott (29 July 2009), "Nigerian forces move in on Islamist radicals", Christian Science Monitor
 Human Rights Watch (2012), Spiraling Violence: Boko Haram Attacks and Security Force Abuses in Nigeria, 11 October 2012
 Murtada, Ahmad (2013), Boko Haram: Its Beginnings, Principles and Activities in Nigeria, Islamic Studies Department, University of Bayero, Kano, Nigeria

2009 murders in Nigeria
2009 mass shootings in Africa
2009 riots
2000s massacres in Nigeria
21st century in Maiduguri
21st century in Yobe State
Arson in Nigeria
Arson in the 2000s
Attacks on buildings and structures in 2009
Attacks on buildings and structures in Nigeria
Attacks on police stations in the 2000s
Battles in 2009
Battles involving Nigeria
Bauchi State
Crime in Kano State
Crime in Maiduguri
Islamic extremism in Northern Nigeria
July 2009 crimes
July 2009 events in Nigeria
Kano State
Mass murder in 2009
Mass murder in Borno State
Mass shootings in Nigeria
2009 uprising
Military of Nigeria
Murder in Yobe State
Potiskum
Riots and civil disorder in Nigeria
Terrorist incidents in Africa in 2009
Terrorist incidents in Borno State
Terrorist incidents in Nigeria in the 2000s
Terrorist incidents in Yobe State
Attacks in Nigeria in 2009